Il romanzo della mia vita is a 1952 Italian biographical melodrama film. It depicts real life events of singer-actor Luciano Tajoli, who plays himself in the film.

Cast

Luciano Tajoli: Himself
Antonella Lualdi: Maria
Fulvia Franco: Clara
Vittorio Sanipoli: Gianni
Giulietta Masina: Paola
Francesco Golisano: Piero
Guglielmo Inglese: Pasquale Curcio
Enrico Glori: il presentatore
Lauro Gazzolo: l'avvocato Marchetti
Nino Cavalieri: il direttore del teatro Odeon
Mario Siletti: l'organizzatore dell'Ora del dilettante
Camillo Pilotto: il commissario
Enzo Biliotti: il signor Vismara
Renato Malavasi: il professore del consulto
Fedele Gentile: Enzo Tajoli
Rita Livesi: la madre di Luciano
Armando Annuale: il maestro di pianoforte
Claudio Ermelli: il custode del teatro
Mimo Billi: il padre di Paola
Gildo Bocci: il padrone della trattoria
Margherita Bossi Nicosia: la padrona della trattoria
Bruna Corrà: la cameriera di Clara
Liana Del Balzo: la signora elegante alla trattoria 
Alfredo Rizzo: il ladro

References

External links
 

1952 films
1950s Italian-language films
Italian biographical drama films
1950s biographical drama films
Italian black-and-white films
Melodrama films
1950s Italian films